Inositol phosphates are a group of mono- to hexaphosphorylated inositols. They play crucial roles in diverse cellular functions, such as cell growth, apoptosis, cell migration, endocytosis, and cell differentiation.
The group comprises:
 inositol monophosphate (IP)
 inositol bisphosphate (IP2)
 inositol trisphosphate (IP3)
 inositol pentakisphosphate (IP5)
 inositol hexaphosphate (IP6) also known as phytic acid, or phytate (as a salt).

Functions

Inositol triphosphate

Inositol trisphosphates act on the inositol triphosphate receptor to release calcium into the cytoplasm. Further reading: Function of calcium in humans

Other
Inositol tetra-, penta-, and hexa-phosphates have been implicated in gene expression.

Inositol hexaphosphate 
Inositol hexaphosphate facilitates the formation of the six-helix bundle and assembly of the immature HIV-1 Gag lattice. IP6 makes ionic contacts with two rings of lysine residues at the centre of the Gag hexamer. Proteolytic cleavage then unmasks an alternative binding site, where IP6 interaction promotes the assembly of the mature capsid lattice. These studies identify IP6 as a naturally occurring small molecule that promotes both assembly and maturation of HIV-1.

References

External links

Organophosphates
Phosphate esters
Signal transduction
Inositol